Macracantha hasselti, commonly known as Hasselt's spiny spider, is a species of spider belonging to the family Araneidae. It is a native of Asia, occurring from India eastwards to Indonesia.

Typical of this genus, the male of this species is small and nondescript but the female is larger and very colourful. It is usually around 8 mm in length, excluding legs. The carapace has a dense covering of white hairs. The abdomen is roughly triangular and bright orange with 12 black spots arranged in two rows along the back and six black spikes around the margin, the two at the rear corners being the longest.

Gallery

References

 

hasselti
Spiders described in 1837
Spiders of Asia